Chirk was a rural district in the administrative county of Denbighshire from 1894 to 1935. 

The rural district was formed from parts of Oswestry and Corwen Rural Sanitary Districts.

The district contained three civil parishes:
Chirk
Glyntraen			
Llansanfraid Glynceiriog

Chirk Rural District was abolished by a County Review Order in 1935, becoming part of the new Ceiriog Rural District.

Sources
Denbighshire Administrative County (Vision of Britain)

History of Denbighshire
History of Wrexham County Borough
Rural districts of Wales